The fistball event at the 2001 World Games in Akita, Japan took place between the 18th and the 20th of August. A total of 40 athletes from 5 teams entered the competition. The competition took place at Yabase Stadium.

Competition format
In preliminary round teams played round-robin system. After end of this stage first and second team advanced to the final. In consolation round rest of the teams played again in round-robin format and winner of this stage got third place in the tournament.

Teams
  Austria 
  Brazil 
  Germany 
  Japan 
  Switzerland

Preliminary round

|}

Consolation round

|}

Final

|}

Final ranking

References

External links
 International Fistball Association
 Fistball on IWGA website
 Results

2001
2001 World Games